Josemania asplundii, synonym Tillandsia asplundii, is a species in the genus Josemania, native to Ecuador and Peru. It was first acquired by the 1842 United States Expedition in South America.

References

Tillandsioideae
Flora of Ecuador
Flora of Peru